Mount Douglass is an ice-covered mountain  east-southeast of Mount Woodward on the south side of Boyd Glacier, in the Ford Ranges of Marie Byrd Land. It was discovered in 1934 on aerial flights of the Byrd Antarctic Expedition, and was named for Malcolm C. Douglass, a dog driver at West Base of the United States Antarctic Service (1939–41).

References 

Mountains of Marie Byrd Land